Escalona is a municipality located in the north of the province of Toledo, which in turn is part of the autonomous community of Castile-La Mancha, Spain. According to the 2017 census (INE), the municipality has a population of 3,240 inhabitants, many of whom are settled in several housing estates outside the town itself.

The town lies 30 metres above the right bank of the river Alberche, in the comarca of Torrijos, which is a part of the historical region of New Castile.

History

Escalona's strategic location, on the Alberche river  and between Avila and Toledo, suggests there may have been a fortress there in Roman times or during the Visigoth period. Following the  conquest of Toledo (1085), by Alfonso VI of León and Castile, it was a key defensive point against raids by the Almoravides and Almohades that attacked the place in 1131, 1137 and, again, in 1196.

The Mudéjar-style Castle of Escalona, built in the 15th century, is the most characteristic building of the town.

Twin towns
 Villena, Spain
 Peñafiel, Spain

Notable people
Juan Manuel (1282-1348), writer
Esteban de Aguilar y Zúñiga, theologian

References

External links
Instituto Nacional de Estadística (INE) website
Official website of the Diputación Provincial de Toledo

Municipalities in the Province of Toledo